Ape to Man is a dramatised documentary on the scientific community's journey to find the missing link in human evolution, between our ancestors the apes and modern man today.

Synopsis
Ape to Man: Theory of evolution is a dramatised documentary on the scientific community's attempts to find evidence of the missing link, between our ancestors the apes and modern man today. The publication of Charles Darwin's The Origin of the Species,  started a quest for answers, this documentary follows a timeline journey of discovery from 1856 to 2005, analysing the impact each discovery had on the theories of human evolution.

The story starts with German schoolteacher (and former anatomy student) Johann Fuhlrott in 1856, recognises that a cave found skull and legbone differ enough from normal humans to possibly be a missing link. The fossilised bones found here, were 40,000 years old, from Neanderthal man, who used stone tools for opportunist hunting, harnessed fire and lived in caves. He was stocky, muscular, had a huge brain and skull, was good to organise, communicate, plan strategy and had advanced human skills.

Then in 1889, in Java, Indonesia, in Asia, Eugène Dubois came to be in possession of a fossilised skull with a brain cavity seemingly too large to be that of an ape. He had discovered Java Man (pithicantharus erectus), who had lived some 800,000 years ago. Duboir's find was rejected by the scientific community as was believed to be too ape-like.
In 1912, a fake fossil was discovered by Charles Dawson with a large skull and ape-like jaws. At the time it fit with the scientific community's perception of the missing link's large brain with apelike characteristics, it took 40 years to uncover that Piltdown Man was a forgery.

In 1974, scientists in Ethiopia, Africa, discover a skeleton of Australopithecus afarensis (Lucy) from around 3.2 million years ago. Lucy's ancestors had existed in a forested environment for 50 million years, living mainly on fruit. Lucy developed the ability to walk on 2 legs (bipedally) across grassland to cope with naturally occurring deforestation. By standing upright, Lucy could see further than other apes as a defence against predators. Coincidentally, this adaption freed up the hands for later tool use.

In 1996 the investigation went high tech. Matthias Krings from Munich university managed to extract 40,000 year old DNA from the Neanderthal bone.  DNA tests on modern man reveal only 8 differences occur in any range of modern man, in the Neanderthal DNA there were 30 differences, proving he was of an entirely different species.

Half a million years ago Hominids (Homo erectus) first migrated out from Africa to Europe and Asia. They settled becoming Neanderthals in Europe. 200,000 years ago, there was a second migration from Africa, this time by Homo sapiens, the encroached upon the pre-existing species with superior weapons, better organization and more numbers and eventually forcing Neanderthal and Homo erectus to extinction.

Criticism
Ape to Man: Theory of evolution did draw criticism from the scientific community about speculative claims made by the producers of the documentary about evidence gained from ancient fragments  The specific points noted that were speculative were:
 Why did Homo erectus develop complex sweat glands, causing gradual hairlessness of the skin?
 how could hair loss make speech possible when this does not occur similarly in other species?
 Does a single healed fossilised bone suggest a tight knit family group?
 Did Homo erectus tame fire before learning to start a fire?
 There are contradictary arguments about the Taung child (Australopithecus africanus) evolutionary timeline.
 There are contradictary arguments about Lucy (Australopithecus africanus) walking upright, the evolution of bipedalism.
 There are inconsistencies in Neanderthal DNA testing and conclusions.

Cast
 Leslie Aiello as Self - Head of Graduate School, University College, London (as Prof. Leslie Aiello) 
 Joe Cain as Self - Science & Technology Studies, University College, London (as Dr. Joe Cain) 
 Kevin Hudson as Eugène Dubois
 Tessa Jubber as Dora Dart 
 Chris Rogers as Svänte Paabo 
 Thorsten Wedekind as Johann Fuhlrott

Advisors and crew
Johannesburg Zoo
Dr. Frances Thackery 
Professor Phillip V. Tobias
Dr. Terry Hopkinson 
Linvatec UK Ltd 
Editor = Crispin Holland 
Cinematography =  Brian McDairmant

References

External links

Ape to Man Video

American documentary television films
English-language television shows
Documentary films about prehistoric life
Documentary television shows about evolution